The 1977 U.S. Open was the 77th U.S. Open, held June 16–19 at Southern Hills Country Club in Tulsa, Oklahoma. Hubert Green won the first of his two major titles, one stroke ahead of runner-up Lou Graham, the 1975 champion.

Green began the final round with the lead, but 11 players were within three shots. Graham made a charge on the back nine, collecting birdies at 12, 14, 15, and 16 en route to a 68 (−2) and a 279 (−1) total. With four holes to play, Green needed to play even-par to win the championship. As he stepped off the 14th green, however, he was approached by tournament officials and a lieutenant with the Tulsa police, who told him that they had received a phone call threatening to assassinate Green while he played the 15th hole. Green decided to play on, then proceeded to hit his drive into a tree—which probably saved it from going out of bounds. Green birdied the 16th and took a two-stroke lead to the 18th tee. Although he struggled on the hole, he managed to make a four-footer for bogey and the victory.

This year marked the final U.S. Open appearance by Sam Snead, two-time champion Julius Boros, and Tommy Bolt, who had won the 1958 Open at Southern Hills. All three received exemptions by the USGA, and all three missed the cut. This was the first time that the television broadcast of the U.S. Open covered all 18 holes of the final round.

It was the third major championship at Southern Hills; it previously hosted the U.S. Open in 1958 and the PGA Championship in 1970. The U.S. Open returned in 2001 and the PGA Championship in 1982, 1994, 2007, and 2022.

Course layout

Past champions in the field

Made the cut

Missed the cut 

Source:

Round summaries

First round
Thursday, June 16, 1977

Second round
Friday, June 17, 1977

Amateurs: Miller (+6), Fought (+7), Zabel (+9), Sander (+14), Choate (+15), Sonnier (+15), Cook (+16), King (+16), Gregg (+20), Rheim (+29).

Third round
Saturday, June 18, 1977

Final round
Sunday, June 19, 1977

Amateurs: Lindy Miller (+19), John Fought (+22)

Scorecard
Final round

Cumulative tournament scores, relative to par

Source:

References

External links
USGA Championship Database
USOpen.com - 1977

U.S. Open (golf)
Golf in Oklahoma
Sports in Tulsa, Oklahoma
U.S. Open
U.S. Open (golf)
U.S. Open (golf)